William Lundbeck (16 October 1863 in Aalborg – 18 May 1941 in Kongens Lyngby) was a Danish entomologist mainly interested in Diptera. He was a Professor in the University Museum in Copenhagen.
Lundbeck's most important work was Diptera Danica. Genera and species of flies Hitherto found in Denmark. Copenhagen & London, 1902-1927. 7 vols. 

The Parts of this work are
1907. Stratiomyidae, Xylophagidae, Coenomyiidae, Tabanidae, Leptididae, Acroceridae. Diptera Danica 1. Copenhagen.
1908. Asilidae, Bombyliidae, Therevidae, Scenopinidae. Diptera Danica 2. Copenhagen.
1910. Empididae. Diptera Danica 3. Copenhagen.
1912. Dolichopodidae. Diptera Danica 4. Copenhagen.
1916. Lonchopteridae, Syrphidae. Diptera Danica 5. Copenhagen.
1922. Pipunculidae, Phoridae. Diptera Danica 6. Copenhagen.
1927. Platypezidae, Tachinidae. Diptera Danica 7. Copenhagen.

Before turning to insects, however, he participated on the Ingolf expedition to the North Atlantic in 1895-1896 and produced three significant reports on the deep sea porifera collected by the expedition.

Collection
Lundbeck's insect collection is in The Zoological Museum, University of Copenhagen (Zoologisk Museum, Københavns Universitet).

Notes

Sources 
Evenhuis, N. L. 1997: Litteratura taxonomica dipterorum (1758-1930). Volume 1 (A-K); Volume 2 (L-Z). - Leiden, Backhuys Publishers 1; 2 VII+1-426; 427-871
Heller, W. 1943: [Lundbeck, W.] - Notulae Ent. 23 60

External links
Diptera Danica at BHL

1863 births
1941 deaths
Danish entomologists
Dipterists